This is the list of Qatari Premier League top scorers season by season.

References

Football in Qatar
Qatar